The 2021 Quito Challenger was a professional tennis tournament played on clay courts. It was the 22nd edition of the tournament which was part of the 2021 ATP Challenger Tour. It took place in Quito, Ecuador between 13 and 19 September 2021.

Singles main-draw entrants

Seeds

 1 Rankings are as of 30 August 2021.

Other entrants
The following players received wildcards into the singles main draw:
  Álvaro Guillén Meza
  Antonio Cayetano March
  Gian Carlos Rodríguez

The following players received entry from the qualifying draw:
  Luca Castelnuovo
  Alexis Gautier
  Alejandro Gómez
  Christian Langmo

Champions

Singles

 Facundo Mena def.  Gonzalo Lama 6–4, 6–4.

Doubles

 Alejandro Gómez /  Thiago Agustín Tirante def.  Adrián Menéndez Maceiras /  Mario Vilella Martínez 7–5, 6–7(5–7), [10–8].

References

2021 ATP Challenger Tour
2021
2021 in Ecuadorian sport
September 2021 sports events in South America